Elite Model Look International 2016 was held on November 23, 2016, in Lisbon, Portugal. The winners of the title was Jana Tvrdiková from Czech Republic and Davidson Obennebo from Nigeria.

Placements

References 

Fashion events in Portugal
2010s fashion
2016 in Portugal
2016 in fashion